Wolf-Hendrik Paul Beyer (born 14 February 1972, in Düsseldorf) is a retired German athlete who specialised in the high jump. He represented his country at the 1992 Summer Olympics as well as two outdoor and one indoor World Championships. In addition, he won the bronze medal at the 1994 European Indoor Championships. He Beyer retired in 1996 although he made a brief comeback in 2006.

His personal bests in the event are 2.28 metres outdoors (Rome 1994) and 2.38 metres indoors (Weinheim 1994).

Competition record

References 

1972 births
Living people
German male high jumpers
Olympic athletes of Germany
Athletes (track and field) at the 1992 Summer Olympics
World Athletics Championships athletes for Germany
Sportspeople from Düsseldorf